Kızılcadağ, Korkuteli is a village in the District of Korkuteli, Antalya Province, Turkey.

References

Villages in Korkuteli District